Narayan Patil is Shiv Sena politician from Solapur district, Maharashtra. He is a member of the 13th Maharashtra Legislative Assembly representing the Karmala Assembly Constituency. He is known as Aaba in Karmala constituency.

Positions held
 2014: Elected to Maharashtra Legislative Assembly

References

External links
 Shiv Sena official website

Maharashtra MLAs 2014–2019
Living people
Shiv Sena politicians
People from Solapur district
Marathi politicians
Year of birth missing (living people)